Shahrak-e Vali-ye Asr Sar Tang-e Bahram Khani (also Romanized as Shahrak-e Valī-ye ‘Aşr Sar Tang-e Bahrām Khānī; also known as Shahrak-e Valī‘aşr and Shahrak-e Valī-ye ‘Aşr) is a village in Dustan Rural District, Badreh District, Darreh Shahr County, Ilam Province, Iran. At the 2006 census, its population was 2,284, in 488 families. The village is populated by Kurds.

References 

Populated places in Darreh Shahr County
Kurdish settlements in Ilam Province